The Ballad of John Henry is the seventh studio album by the American blues rock musician Joe Bonamassa. Produced by Kevin Shirley, it was released on 24 February 2009 by J&R Adventures and topped the US Billboard Top Blues Albums chart.

Reception

The music website Allmusic gave The Ballad of John Henry four out of five stars, with its reviewer Stephen Thomas Erlewine claiming that "everything that [Bonamassa]'s dabbled with on previous albums is pulled together here, making for his most varied album and possibly his best, even if that heaviness means that it's not necessarily the easiest to enjoy".

Track listing

Chart performance

Personnel

Musical performers
Joe Bonamassa – guitars, vocals, liner notes
Rick Melick – keyboards, backing vocals
Blondie Chaplin – rhythm guitar
Carmine Rojas – bass guitar
Anton Fig – drums
Bogie Bowles – drums
Lee Thornburg – brass instruments, brass arrangements
David Woodford – saxophone

Production personnel
Kevin Shirley – production, mixing
Jared Kvitka – engineering
Additional personnel
Rob Shanahan – photography
Dennis Friel – art direction, graphic design, illustrations
Josh Smith – graphic design assistance
Marcus Bird – photography and direction

References

2009 albums
Joe Bonamassa albums
Albums produced by Kevin Shirley